Morgan Branch is a stream in DeKalb County in the U.S. state of Missouri. It is a tributary of the Little Third Fork.

Morgan Branch was named after William Morgan, the original owner of the site.

See also
List of rivers of Missouri

References

Rivers of DeKalb County, Missouri
Rivers of Missouri